Yonatan Neril (born September 30, 1980) is an interfaith environmental advocate, NGO director, and rabbi. He founded and directs the Interfaith Center for Sustainable Development (ICSD), based in Jerusalem.

He co-authored several reports on seminary education and ecology, including the Report on Faith and Ecology Courses in North American Seminaries, the Report on Faith and Ecology Teaching in Holy Land Seminaries, and the Report on Catholic Ecology Courses in Catholic Seminaries. He also co-edited two books on Judaism and ecology, including Uplifting People and Planet: 18 Essential Jewish Teachings on the Environment.

Neril engages in international speaking tours on religion and ecology, throughout Morocco, Italy, Turkey, Canada, the United States, Israel, and Spain.

Career and work 
Neril has co-organized several interfaith environmental conferences in Jerusalem, New York City, and Washington D.C.

In July 2011, Neril and the ICSD team organized an interfaith panel of Jewish, Muslim and Christian authorities, who discussed the religious importance of ecological sustainability. The panelists were Auxiliary Bishop to the Latin Patriarch of Jerusalem Msgr. William Shomali, the Deputy Minister of the Palestinian Authority’s Ministry of Religious Affairs Haj Salah Zuheika and AJC International Director of Inter-religious Affairs Rabbi David Rosen. Rabbi Neril also spoke at the event.

In March, 2012, Neril spoke at and co-organized  the Interfaith Climate and Energy Conference in Jerusalem, which was focused on promoting change and action for a sustainable development within faith communities around the globe. The conference was co-organized by ICSD and the Konrad Adenauer Stiftung. 

In October, 2014, Neril spoke at the Faith and Ecology Conference for Seminarians in Jerusalem, which was co-organized by the Interfaith Center for Sustainable Development, the Konrad Adenauer Foundation and the Salesian Pontifical University. He discussed the importance of current and emerging faith leaders being a potential vehicle for environmental stewardship and to expand ecology and environmental teaching and action within seminaries.

Neril, together with H.H. Swami Chidanand Saraswati, Rev. Michael Bernard Beckwith, and Sadhvi Bhagawati Saraswati, spoke at the “Climate Change and You” event which formed part of the Parliament of World Religions in 2015. Rabbi Neril spoke to the moral imperative to take action in light of mounting environmental degradation.
Neril spoke along with other religious figures at the International Islamic Climate Change Symposium in Istanbul, Turkey in August 2015. The aim of the gathering was to release the Islamic Climate Change Declaration, which intended to provide an “urgent and radical reappraisal” of today’s humanity.

In June, 2016, Neril presented at the International Seminar on Science and Religion for Environment Care in Torreciudad, Spain and at a press conference in Madrid. The Seminar concluded with a Torreciudad declaration that summarized in six points how a partnership between science and religion could promote ecological sustainability.

Recent work 
In the Jerusalem Press Club, on July 26, 2017, Neril acted as moderator of the panel with a judge of the Muslim Sharia Courts in Israel, Kadi Iyad Zahalha; Rabbi David Rosen, AJC International Director of Inter-religious Affairs; and the Custos of the Holy Land, Father Francesco Patton. The event focused on the key role faith leaders can play on raising awareness of the relevance and urgency of curbing climate change and achieving environmental sustainability. The three authorities agreed with Neril on the need of putting aside religious and ideological differences for the wellbeing and future of our “common home”.

Personal life and views
Neril lives in Jerusalem with his wife and children.
Neril writes frequently on religion and ecology, climate change, and environmental sustainability, including for blogs on The Huffington Post and The Times of Israel. He has emphasized how the climate crisis is as much ecological as it is spiritual, and how in our times, living righteously demands being ecologically responsible. He has stressed the importance of clergy taking a leadership role in helping faith adherents think long-term, moderate consumption, and rein in greed.

He has written about the importance of cultivating awareness to address problems where we do not see a direct link between our actions and the problem.

References 

1980 births
Living people
Israeli environmentalists
Israeli Orthodox rabbis